Pseudexentera cressoniana, known generally as the shagbark hickory leafroller or oak olethreutid leafroller, is a species of tortricid moth in the family Tortricidae.

The MONA or Hodges number for Pseudexentera cressoniana is 3246.

References

Further reading

External links

 

Eucosmini
Moths described in 1864